The Bresse Gauloise is a French breed of domestic chicken. It originates in the historic region and former province of Bresse, in the regions of Rhône-Alpes, Bourgogne and Franche-Comté, in eastern France. Because of legal restrictions on the use of the name, only white chickens raised within that area may be called "Bresse"; outside it, they are given the name "Gauloise"; the breed name combines both. Four colours are recognised for the Bresse Gauloise, three of them linked to areas within Bresse: the Bresse de Bourg is "grey" (silver-pencilled); the Bresse de Bény is white; the Bresse de Louhans is black; a blue variety has recently been created. White Bresse de Bény chickens and capons raised in the area of Bresse have appellation d'origine contrôlée status and are marketed as poulet de Bresse; they are regarded as a premium product and command higher prices than other chickens.

History

The first documentation of the chickens of Bresse reportedly dates from 12 November 1591, when the citizens of Bourg presented two dozen birds to Joachim de Rye, Marquis de Treffort. In the early nineteenth century, the lawyer, politician, epicure and gastronome Jean Anthelme Brillat-Savarin (1755–1826), who was born at Belley in the Ain, is supposed to have described the Bresse chicken as "the queen of poultry, the poultry of kings". Like the La Flèche, which was raised and fattened in a similar fashion, the Bresse chicken had high standing in the market. Nevertheless, by about 1900 the breed had virtually disappeared. Its recovery was due to fancy breeders, who selectively bred a sufficient number of white chickens for the breed to become stable. A new breed standard was drawn up in 1904.

Characteristics

The Bresse is preferred as a meat bird due to the fat marbling in the meat is same as beef steaks are marbled, resulting in the juiciest breast meat of any cooked chicken although taking longer to achieve a mature weight it is worth the wait.
They are also great egg layers

Use

Although the Bresse Gauloise is principally famous as a meat breed, it is a good layer of large white eggs, which in the black Louhans variety may weigh . Hens are usually non-sitting.

References 

Chicken breeds
Chicken breeds originating in France